Jesse Lee (March 12, 1758 – September 12, 1816) was an American Methodist Episcopal clergyman and pioneer, born in Prince George's County, Virginia. A preacher after 1783, in 1789 he visited New England and established Methodism from the Connecticut River to the farthest settlement in Maine.  He formed the first Methodist class in New England, at Stratford, Connecticut, September 26, 1787.    He preached his first sermon (outdoors) on June 7 or 17, 1789 in Norwalk, Connecticut.  He held the first Methodist class in Boston, Massachusetts on July 13, 1792.  For his pioneer work in New England he was often called the Apostle of Methodism.  He was a friend of Francis Asbury, and served as his assistant from 1797 to 1800.  He lacked only one vote of being elected Bishop by the General Conference of 1800, but was appointed to be a presiding elder of the south district of Virginia in 1801.  He wrote A Short Account of the Life and Death of the Rev. John Lee (1805) and a History of Methodism in America (1807), which has value for the early period.  On May 22, 1809 Lee was appointed Chaplain of the United States House of Representatives  He was reappointed on November 2, 1812 and served for two sessions.  Upon leaving the chaplaincy of the House he was appointed Chaplain of the United States Senate on September 27, 1814 where he served until December 1815.

Speech at Norwalk

In June 1789, Lee, came to Norwalk to preach his first sermon in Connecticut. He had some reason to believe that the Hezekiah Rogers house on Cross Street would be available for the meeting, and word had been sent around among those interested to assemble there. When Lee arrived, Hezekiah was not at home, and his wife hesitated to open  the house to a public meeting. A neighbor refused to let Lee use her orchard for concern that the gathering would trample down the grass. Finally, Lee assembled his audience under an apple tree by the roadside and preached his sermon from the text "Ye must be born again." Such was the beginning of Methodism in Norwalk. Today, there is a stone marker at the location.

Church at Granville
In 1797 the first Methodist Episcopal church west of the Connecticut River was built in Granville, Massachusetts. On September 19, 1798, Jesse Lee and Francis Asbury led the Third New England Annual Conference there.

See also
 Second Great Awakening
 Mount Olivet Cemetery (Baltimore)
 Jesse Lee Home for Children
 Jesse Lee Church, the oldest Methodist church in Maine

Literature
 Minton Thrift, Memoir of the Rev. Jesse Lee, with Extracts from his Journals (New York, 1823)
 L. M. Lee, Life and Times of Jesse Lee (Richmond, Va., 1848)
 W. H. Meredith, Jesse Lee, A Methodist Apostle (New York, 1909)

References

External links
 Jesse Lee United Methodist Church in Easton, CT established 1789
 Jesse Lee United Methodist Church in Ridgefield, CT established 1789
 North United Methodist Church in Manchester, CT organized 1790
 Cox Memorial United Methodist Church in Hallowell, ME mentions preaching by Jesse Lee in town on October 13, 1793
 Readfield (ME) United Methodist Church Jesse Lee Meeting House dates to 1795
 Duncan United Methodist Church in Georgetown, SC mentions Jesse Lee glanding in February 1785
 Jesse Lee preached at Dudley Chapel in Sudlersville, MD (est. 1783)
 The Jesse Lee homes in Alaska were Methodist run orphanages started in 1890 as a tribute to Jess Lee
 

American Methodist clergy
Chaplains of the United States Senate
Chaplains of the United States House of Representatives
History of Methodism in the United States
1758 births
1816 deaths
Burials at Mount Olivet Cemetery (Baltimore)
History of Methodism
Methodist circuit riders
People from Prince George County, Virginia